Nathaniel Neale (born 16 September 1988) is a New Zealand professional rugby league footballer. He previously played for the South Sydney Rabbitohs in the National Rugby League.

Background
Neal was born and raised in Westmere, a central suburb of Auckland, New Zealand.

He played for the Ponsonby Ponies Under 21s team before being signed by the New Zealand Warriors.

Playing career
He played for the Warriors' NYC team in 2008 before moving on to the Warriors' New South Wales Cup team, Auckland Vulcans in 2009. At this time, he was also aligned with the Auckland Rugby League club, Mount Albert Lions.

Wanting to further his professional Rugby league career, Neale signed a 2-year contract with the Ipswich Jets in the Queensland Cup starting in 2011. He made his debut in Round 1 of 2011 under coaches Ben Walker and Shane Walker. It was not long before Neale made his mark in the competition and was regularly nominated as the team's best.

In his second year at the club, Neale continued to prove an asset to the team. At the end of 2012, Neale was rewarded with the top award, the Alan Langer Medal for "best and fairest" and signed on for a third year at the Ipswich Jets.  In Neale's third year at the Ipswich Jets he earned the top 2 awards for the club, the Alan Langer Medal and the Players' Player award.

In October 2013, Neale signed a 1-year contract with the South Sydney Rabbitohs starting in 2014.

In Round 3 of the 2014 NRL season, Neale made his NRL debut for the Rabbitohs against the Wests Tigers.

In 2016 Neale joined the Ipswich Jets in the Intrust Super Cup (Now Hotplus Cup) 

Neale joined Ipswich Jets

Representative career
In 2013, Neale played for the Queensland Residents.

In 2017, Neale played for Queensland Residents

In 2019, Neale played Prop for Queensland Residents in their 42-22 win over NSW Residents

References

External links
2014 South Sydney Rabbitohs profile

1988 births
Living people
Auckland rugby league team players
Ipswich Jets players
New Zealand rugby league players
Mount Albert Lions players
North Sydney Bears NSW Cup players
Rugby league props
Rugby league players from Auckland
Rugby league second-rows
South Sydney Rabbitohs players